Janusz is a masculine Polish given name.
It is also the shortened form of January and Januarius.

People 
Janusz Akermann (born 1957), Polish painter
Janusz Bardach, Polish gulag survivor and physician
Janusz Bielański, Roman Catholic priest
Janusz Bojarski (born 1956), Polish general
Janusz Bokszczanin (1894–1973), Polish Army colonel
Janusz Christa (1934–2008), Polish author of comic books
Janusz Domaniewski (1891–1954), Polish ornithologist
Janusz Gajos, Polish actor
Janusz Gaudyn (1935–1984), Polish physician, writer and poet
Janusz Głowacki (1938–2017), Polish-American author and screenwriter
Janusz Janowski (born 1965), Polish painter, jazz drummer and art theorist
Janusz Kamiński (born 1959), Polish cinematographer and film director
Janusz Korczak (Henryk Goldszmit), Polish-Jewish children's author, pediatrician, and child pedagogist
Janusz Kurtyka (born 1960), Polish historian specializing in the culture and religion of Poland in the 16th and 17th centuries
Janusz Liberkowski (born 1953), winner of American Inventor season one
Janusz Magnuski (1933–1999), Polish author and military historian
Janusz Meissner (1901–1978), Polish Air Force pilot, journalist and author
Janusz Olejniczak (born 1952), Polish classical pianist
Janusz Pasierb (1929–1993), Polish catholic priest, poet, writer, and historian
Janusz Pawłowski (born 1959), Polish judoka
Janusz Piekałkiewicz (1925–1988), Polish underground soldier, historian, writer, and television/cinema director and producer
Janusz Sanocki (1954–2020), Polish politician
Janusz Skumin Tyszkiewicz, Lithuanian writer
Janusz Spyra (born 1958), Polish historian specializing in Cieszyn Silesia
Janusz Szrom (born 1968), Polish jazz vocalist and composer
Janusz Waluś (born 1953), Polish assassin
Janusz Witwicki (1903–1946), Polish architect and art historian
Janusz Wójcik (born 1953), Polish politician, and former football player and coach
Janusz Zajdel (1938–1985), Polish science-fiction author
Janusz Andrzej Zakrzewski (1932–2008), Polish physicist
Janusz Zalewski (1903–1944), Polish sailor
Janusz K. Zawodny (1921–2012), Polish-American historian, political scientist, and former World War II resistance fighter and soldier
Janusz Zaorski (born 1947), Polish film director, scenarist and actor
Janusz Żurakowski, Polish-born fighter and test pilot

Politics
Janusz I of Warsaw (c. 1340 – 1429), Duke of Warsaw
Janusz III of Masovia (1502–1526), Polish duke of Masovia
Janusz Aleksander Sanguszko (1712–1775), Polish-Lithuanian Commonwealth magnate
Janusz Chwierut (born 1965), Polish politician
Janusz Dobrosz, Polish politician
Janusz Jędrzejewicz (1885–1951), Polish politician and educator
Janusz Kaczmarek (born 1961), Polish lawyer, prosecutor and politician
Janusz Kiszka (1600–1653), Polish-Lithuanian politician and magnate
Janusz Kochanowski (born 1940), Polish lawyer and diplomat
Janusz Kołodziej (politician) (born 1959), Polish politician
Janusz Korwin-Mikke (born 1942), Polish conservative liberal political commentator and politician
Janusz Krasoń (born 1956), Polish politician
Janusz Leon Wiśniewski (born 1954), Polish scientist and writer
Janusz Lewandowski (born 1951), Polish economist and politician
Janusz Maksymiuk (born 1947), Polish politician
Janusz Onyszkiewicz (born 1937), Polish mathematician, alpinist and politician
Janusz Ostrogski (1554–1620), Polish-Lithuanian noble
Janusz Palikot (born 1964), Polish politician, activist and businessman
Janusz Pałubicki (born 1948), Polish politician and activist
Janusz Radziwiłł (1579–1620), Polish nobleman
Janusz Radziwiłł (1612–1655), Polish-Lithuanian noble and magnate
Janusz Radziwiłł (1880–1967), Polish nobleman and politician
Janusz Reiter (born 1952), Polish diplomat
Janusz Śniadek (born 1955), Polish politician
Janusz Suchywilk (c. 1310 – 1382), Polish nobleman
Janusz Tazbir (born 1927), Polish historian
Janusz Tomaszewski (born 1956), Polish politician
Janusz Tyszkiewicz Łohojski, Polish-Lithuanian Commonwealth magnate and politician
Janusz Wiśniowiecki, starost of Krzemieniec
Janusz Wojciechowski (born 1954), Polish politician
Janusz Zabłocki (born 1926), Polish politician, publicist, Catholic activist, lawyer and soldier of Armia Krajowa
Janusz Zemke (born 1949), Polish politician
Janusz Ziółkowski (1924–2000), Polish sociologist and politician

Sports 

Janusz Brzozowski (handballer) (born 1951), Polish handball player
Janusz Centka, Polish glider pilot
Janusz Dziedzic (born 1980), Polish football striker
Janusz Gol (born 1985), Polish football midfielder
Janusz Gortat (born 1948), Polish boxer
Janusz Jojko (born 1960), Polish footballer
Janusz Karweta (born 1988), Polish pair skater
Janusz Kołodziej (speedway rider) (born 1984), Polish speedway rider
Janusz Kupcewicz (born 1955), Polish football player
Janusz Krawczyk, Polish luger
Janusz Krężelok (born 1974), Polish cross country skier
Janusz Kudyba (born 1961), Polish football striker
Janusz Kulig (1969–2004), Polish rally driver
Janusz Kusociński (1907–1940), Polish athlete
Janusz Michallik (born 1966), Polish-born retired soccer defender and current coach
Janusz Patrzykont (1912–1982), Polish basketball player
Janusz Pyciak-Peciak (born 1949), Polish modern pentathlete
Janusz Sidło (1933–1993), Polish javelin thrower
Janusz Ślązak (1907–1985), Polish rower
Janusz Sybis (born 1952), Polish football striker
Janusz Trzepizur (born 1959), Polish high jumper
Janusz Turowski (born 1961), Polish football coach and former player
Janusz Waluś (born 1953), Polish ski jumper 
Janusz Wojnarowicz (born 1980), Polish judoka
Janusz Wolański (born 1979), Polish football midfielder

See also 
Janusz A. Zajdel Award, given by the Polish science fiction and fantasy fandom
Janusz, Łódź Voivodeship, Poland
Janusz (slang)
"Nie martw się, Janusz", song by Kury from the album P.O.L.O.V.I.R.U.S.

Polish masculine given names